The PMK Pro-Am is a pro–am snooker tournament held at Minnesota Fats Snooker Club in Glasgow, Scotland. Established in 2014, the tournament remains the only pro-am snooker event in Scotland. The reigning champion is Michael Collumb who became the first amateur to win the event after a 4–3 victory in the 2019 final against Graeme Dott.

Winners

References

Snooker competitions in the United Kingdom